Umar Islam (born 20 March 1997) is a Pakistani cricketer. He made his List A debut for Peshawar in the 2017–18 Regional One Day Cup on 2 February 2018.

References

External links
 

1997 births
Living people
Pakistani cricketers
Place of birth missing (living people)
Peshawar cricketers